Lebyazhye is a rural locality (a selo) and the administrative center of Lebyazhensky Selsoviet of Pavlovsky District, Altai Krai, Russia. The population was 1,019 in 2016. There are 17 streets.

Geography 
Lebyazhye is located 30 km southwest of Pavlovsk (the district's administrative centre) by road. Imeni Mamontova is the nearest rural locality.

References 

Rural localities in Pavlovsky District, Altai Krai